David Dixon (born 28 October 1947) is an English actor and screenwriter. He was born at the Nightingale Maternity Home in Derby, near his father's shop in London Road, and brought up there before the family moved to Normanton in 1959.

Dixon's most notable role was in the 1981 BBC TV series The Hitchhiker's Guide to the Galaxy, in which he starred as Ford Prefect. He also received critical acclaim for his portrayal of Ariel in the 1980 BBC version of The Tempest (directed by John Gorrie). He would later rejoin the Hitchhiker's Guide by lending his voice to the "Ecological Man" and the "Zirzla Leader" in Fit the Twentieth of the radio series, while Geoffrey McGivern, who had originally played the character on radio, returned to the role of Ford.

Despite a relatively sparse TV and film career, David Dixon has over the years acquired a loyal fan following online who call themselves "Dixonites".

Filmography
 A Family at War (1970) (TV series) – Robert Ashton
 Escort Girls (1974) – Hugh Lloyd
 The Sweeney (episode "Big Brother", 1975) (TV) - Andy Deacon
 Jumping Bean Bag (1976, in (BBC TV Play For Today) – Ozymandias Freemantle
 The Legend of Robin Hood (1975) (miniseries) – Prince John
 Rock Follies (1976) (TV series) - PR Man
 A Horseman Riding By (1978) (miniseries) – Keith Horsey
 Lillie (1978) (miniseries) – Prince Leopold 
 A Family Affair (1979) (miniseries) – Clifford
 The Tempest (1980) (TV) – Ariel
 The Hitchhiker's Guide to the Galaxy (1981) (miniseries) – Ford Prefect
 The Missionary (1982) – Young Man
 Cold Warrior (1984) (miniseries)
 Tutti Frutti (1987) (TV) – Stuart Gordon Inverarrity
 Circles of Deceit: Dark Secret (1995) (TV) – DI Ransome
 A Touch of Frost: Fun Times for Swingers  (1996) (TV) – Barry Curzon
 Original Sin (1996) (TV) – Dr Wardle
 ''The Bill (1997) series 13 episode 77 ‘Too much to lose’ (TV) - Brian Vaughan

References

External links
The Dixionary, David Dixon fanpage
Dixonites Livejournal community

1947 births
Living people
English male film actors
English male television actors
People from Derby
People from Normanton, Derby